Explosive Mode is a studio album by San Quinn and Messy Marv. It is the first installment in the three-album series, which did well through independent sales and is considered a Bay Area–classic in the late 1990s.

Track listing

San Quinn albums
Messy Marv albums
1998 albums
Collaborative albums